The Babes Make the Law (French: Les pépées font la loi) is a 1955 French comedy film directed by Raoul André and starring Claudine Dupuis, Dominique Wilms, Louise Carletti and Michèle Philippe. It was shot at the Billancourt Studios in Paris. The film's sets were designed by the art director Louis Le Barbenchon. It was followed by sequel The Babes in the Secret Service in 1956.

Synopsis
When Nathalie is kidnapped, her mother Flora doesn't want to get the police involved. Instead she organises her three other daughters to take the law into their own hands and confront the gang behind it.

Cast 
 Claudine Dupuis as Elvire, daughter of Flora
 Dominique Wilms as Elisabeth, other daughter of Flora
 Louise Carletti as Christine, other daughter of Flora
 Michèle Philippe as Nathalie, daughter of kidnapped Flora
 Suzy Prim as  Flora, the mother
 Jean Gaven as Frédéric Langlet, husband of Christine
 Laurent Dauthuille as Bob, the baby snatcher
 Louis de Funès as Jeannot la Bonne Affaire, barman of "Lotus"
 Jean-Jacques Delbo as Rouge, the gangster who beats Nathalie
 André Roanne as Mr Charles - "Le Professeur"
 René Havard as Calamart, the wrong employee
 Olivier Mathot as Robert, husband of Elizabeth
 Paul Péri as Casanova, the head kidnapper
 Paul Demange as vacuum bag collector
 Paul Dupuis as Massonle husband of Elvire
 Jacqueline Noëlle as La brune du café
 Simone Berthier as 	Hortense
 Jérôme Goulven as Alphonse - le notaire
 Jacques Muller as 	Un client de l'avocat
 Yôko Tani as 	La fleuriste du Lotus

References

Bibliography
 Prime, Rebecca. Hollywood Exiles in Europe: The Blacklist and Cold War Film Culture. Rutgers University Press, 2014.
 Vincendeau, Ginette . Stars and Stardom in French Cinema. Bloomsbury Publishing, 2000.

External links 
 
 Les Pépées font la loi at Films de France

1955 films
1955 comedy films
French comedy films
1950s French-language films
French black-and-white films
Films directed by Raoul André
Films shot at Billancourt Studios
Films shot in Paris
1950s French films